The School of Molecular Bioscience was a constituent body of the Faculty of Science at the University of Sydney, Australia and was established in 2001. This school was merged in 2016 to become the School of Life and Environmental Sciences.

History
The School was renamed the School of Molecular Bioscience from the School of Molecular and Microbial Biosciences on 11 February 2010. The School of Molecular and Microbial Biosciences was formed in 2001 within the Faculty of Science from the amalgamation of the Department of Biochemistry from the Faculty of Science and the Department of Microbiology from the Faculty of Agriculture.

See also
 S*, a collaboration between seven universities and the Karolinska Institutet for training in bioinformatics and genomics

References

External links
 School of Molecular Bioscience at the Faculty of Science, University of Sydney

Educational institutions established in 2001
Molecular Bioscience, School of
2001 establishments in Australia